The Mind's Eye is the debut studio album by the band Stiltskin. The album was driven by the success of the single "Inside", which reached number one in the UK. The follow-up single "Footsteps" reached number 34 in the UK.

It was the only album recorded by the original lineup of the band. The next album, She, would be released in 2006 with a new lineup that only retained lead vocalist Ray Wilson.

Track listing

European and Australian edition

US edition

Personnel
Stiltskin
Ray Wilson – vocals
Peter Lawlor – acoustic and electric guitars, mandolin, backing vocals
James Finnigan – bass guitar, Hammond organ, Wurlitzer piano
Ross McFarlane – drums, percussion

Additional personnel
Sian Bell – cello
Ambrosian Singers – choral opening
Tessa Sturridge – backing vocals

Production
Arranged by Peter Lawlor
Produced, recorded and engineered by Peter Lawlor, assisted on some tracks by  James Finnigan
Mastered by Ted Jensen

Charts

References

1994 debut albums
East West Records albums
Stiltskin albums